Androndrono (also Androndrona Anava) is a town and commune in Madagascar. It belongs to the district of Maroantsetra, which is a part of Analanjirofo Region. The population of the commune was estimated to be approximately 11,000 in 2001 commune census.

Only primary schooling is available. The majority 95% of the population of the commune are farmers, while an additional 5% receives their livelihood from raising livestock. The most important crops are rice and cloves, while other important agricultural products are coffee and beans.

References and notes 

Populated places in Analanjirofo